Neocollyris naviauxi is a species of ground beetle in the genus Neocollyris in the family Carabidae. It was described by Sawada and Weisner in 2003.

References

Naviauxi, Neocollyris
Beetles described in 2003